The 1998 Salford Council election took place on 7 May 1998 to elect members of Salford Metropolitan Borough Council in Greater Manchester, England. One-third of the council was up for election and the Labour Party kept overall control of the council. Overall turnout was 19.39%.

After the election, the composition of the council was:
Labour 57
Liberal Democrat 3

Election result

|}

Ward results

References

1998
1998 English local elections
1990s in Greater Manchester